Mount Nyenchen Tanglha (officially Nyainqêntanglha Feng; ; Chinese: 念青唐古拉峰, Pinyin: Niànqīng Tánggǔlā Fēng) is the highest peak of Nyenchen Tanglha Mountains, which together with the Gangdise range forms the Transhimalaya.

Location
Mount Nyenchen Tanglha is located in the western part of the range on the watershed between the Yarlung Tsangpo (Brahmaputra River) to the south and the endorheic basins of the Changtang to the north. In particular, it lies to the south of Namtso Lake. It belongs to Damxung County in the Prefecture of Lhasa of Tibet.

Mythology
In Tibetan mythology Nyenchen Tanglha is considered the most influential deity in a large part of northern Tibet.
In his mortal form he is shown riding a white horse, wearing a satin dress and holding a horse whip in one hand and a Buddhist rosary in the other.
He is considered to be a bodhisattva on the eighth level, and is a protector of the teachings of the Nyingma tradition.
Nyenchen Tanglha is the subject of many fairy tales and folklore.

The three main summits of Nyenchen Tanglha

With an elevation of 7,162m, Nyenchen Tanglha is the highest mountain of the Transhimalayan range. It has a topographic prominence of 2,239m and its parent mountain is Gurla Mandhata located 890 km east. Key saddle is at 4,923m (30°25'57"N 81°37'28"E) near the spring of Yarlung Tsangpo River (Brahmaputra).

Nyenchen Tanglha has three main summits above 7,000m, located on a northwest–southeast ridge. All three main summits were climbed between 1986 and 1995.

See also
List of Ultras of Tibet, East Asia and neighbouring areas
Nyenchen Tanglha Mountains

References

Sources

Nyainqentanglha
Nyainqentanglha
Seven-thousanders of the Transhimalayas